The 2014 Duke Blue Devils football team represented the Duke University in the 2014 NCAA Division I FBS football season as a member of the Atlantic Coast Conference (ACC) in the Coastal Division. The team was led by head coach David Cutcliffe, in his seventh year, and played its home games at Wallace Wade Stadium in Durham, North Carolina.

Schedule

Personnel

Coaching staff

Game summaries

Elon

at Troy

Kansas

Tulane

at Miami (FL)

at Georgia Tech

Virginia

at Pittsburgh

at Syracuse

Virginia Tech

North Carolina

Wake Forest

vs. Arizona State (Sun Bowl)

Rankings

References

Duke
Duke Blue Devils football seasons
Duke Blue Devils football